CFXJ-FM (93.5 FM, 93.5 Today Radio) is a Canadian radio station in Toronto, Ontario. Owned by Stingray Group, it broadcasts an adult hits format. CFXJ's studios are located at Yonge and St. Clair in Toronto's Deer Park neighbourhood, while its transmitter is located at the top of First Canadian Place in Toronto's Financial District.

The station was launched on February 9, 2001 as Flow 93.5, under the ownership of Denham Jolly's Milestone Radio. The station was Canada's first Black-owned radio station, and first to carry an urban contemporary format. The station was later acquired by CTVglobemedia (now Bell Media) in 2010. It was then resold to Newcap Radio as part of Bell's acquisition of Astral Media, making it a sister to CHBM-FM (which was divested from Astral during the purchase). From its launch through 2022, the station aired various urban and rhythmic formats.

In February 2022, current owner Stingray Radio announced an agreement to transfer rights to the "Flow" branding to CKFG-FM (which had launched as an urban adult contemporary station in 2011), and launch a new format on the 93.5 frequency, a move which led into its current adult hits format.

History

Launch
Milestone Radio, a company incorporated by Denham Jolly, first applied to the Canadian Radio-television and Telecommunications Commission (CRTC) for an urban music station in 1989, but were passed over in favour of a country station, CISS. They applied again in 1997, and were passed over in favour of CBLA, the city's existing Radio One station, which the CBC wanted to move to FM for technical reasons.

Both decisions sparked controversy in Toronto, as the CRTC's reasons for passing over an urban-format station (which Toronto, and Canada as a whole, did not have) in favour of existing radio services were believed to be racist in nature. The lack of an urban station also created immense difficulties for Canadian hip hop, reggae and R&B musicians, who had no radio outlets in Canada to play and promote their music.

As well, the 99.1 signal which was awarded to the CBC was believed to be the last available FM frequency in the city. However, in 1998, the CBC found that it was able to surrender two repeater transmitters outside of Toronto due to CBLA's superior coverage of the region. In 2000, the CRTC opened applications for new services on these two frequencies, and on Milestone's third application, the CRTC awarded the 93.5 frequency to the company on June 16 of that year.

CFXJ signed on the air on February 9, 2001, at 9:35 p.m., under the name Flow 93.5, with "Roots, Rock, Reggae" by Bob Marley and the Wailers being the first song played. Live programming launched on March 1. Before the station became prominent in the Greater Toronto Area, many listeners would tune into Buffalo, New York's 93.7 WBLK, which has aired an urban contemporary format since the 1960s. Since CFXJ's debut, many Canadian hip hop and R&B musicians, including Jully Black, k-os, Kardinal Offishall and Jarvis Church, among others, have made the types of significant career breakthroughs that often eluded Canadian urban musicians in the 1990s.

Rhythmic top 40 era (2007–2014)

In 2005, the station began to shift towards a more rhythmic direction. In 2007, the station re-branded as The New Flow 93.5, completing its shift to a rhythmic contemporary format. By 2009, with Rogers' relaunch of the Kiss top 40 format on CKIS, CFXJ shifted back towards an urban direction. However, this proved unsuccessful, and many of the adult urban tracks were dropped by March 2010.

On June 23, 2010, it was announced that CTVglobemedia's CHUM Radio would acquire the station, subject to CRTC approval; the transaction was approved on December 23. CHUM previously joint ventured with Milestone with CHBN-FM in Edmonton, which was sold to Rogers Radio along with CHST-FM in London. The station's headquarters were relocated from their longtime home at 211 Yonge Street to CTV's 250 Richmond Street West (near 299 Queen Street West, where MuchMusic and other CTV specialty television stations are based). In February 2011, the sale to CTVglobemedia (which was acquired by shareholder Bell Canada and renamed Bell Media several months later) was completed. Upon the closure of the sale, nearly the entirety of its staff was laid off, all specialty programming was cancelled, and the station shifted back to a rhythmic contemporary format.

CHUM's vice president of programming, David Corey, replaced Wayne Williams as PD and reshuffled the lineup, bringing in fellow ex-WJMN/Boston imaging director Scott Morello as APD, and re-teaming morning host Melanie Martin with her fellow CKIS alumni J.J. King. Midday personality Miss Ange, afternoon drive personality Jeni, swing personality (now evenings) Peter Kash, MD Justin Dumont, promotions coordinator Angelique Knights, morning show producer Johnny Michaels, creative writer John Shannon, and producer Korey Bray, along with former sales manager Byron Garby and some other account representatives, were all retained. With the launch of urban AC competitor CKFG-FM, the station moved back to an urban direction once more. However, by December 2012, the station had moved back to a rhythmic CHR format.

In March 2013, the Competition Bureau approved a proposal by Bell Media to acquire Astral Media, under the condition that it divest itself of several television services and radio stations. Following the closure of the merger in July 2013, CFXJ was placed in a blind trust pending its eventual sale. CFXJ, along with four other Astral Media radio stations, was sold to Newcap Radio for $112 million. The deal was approved by the CRTC on March 19, 2014, and the sale closed on March 31, 2014. With the sale, CFXJ moved their studios to the former CFRB and CKFM studios at 2 St. Clair West (at Yonge and St. Clair).

Classic hip hop era (2014–2016)

In late 2014, influenced by the popularity of The Back in the Day Buffet noon-hour mix-show, as well as the growing popularity of the classic hip-hop format in the United States, the station revamped its playlist to include classic hip-hop, R&B and reggae tracks from the late 1980s to the early 2000s, while still playing some currents. In addition, CFXJ added a secondary slogan: "The Best Throwbacks and Hottest Hits." By March 2015, the station's primary slogan was altered to "All The Best Throwbacks".

The Move, return to Flow (2016–2022)

On February 25, 2016, CFXJ went jockless and began promoting a "big move" to take place at 8 a.m. the following Monday (February 29). At that time, after playing "Over" by Toronto native Drake, the station flipped to rhythmic adult contemporary as 93.5 The Move, with a focus on rhythmic and hip-hop hits from the late 1980s, 1990s and 2000s. The first song on "The Move" was "The Way You Move" by OutKast. CFXJ joined CKBE/Montreal as the only English-language rhythmic AC outlets in Canada.

As part of the rebrand, the station also axed numerous on air hosts, including Melanie Martin of the JJ & Melanie morning show, midday host Miss Ange, and evening host Megan Coady. Weekend host J'ness moved to sister station CIHT-FM in Ottawa prior to the rebrand. On November 6, 2017, CFXJ switched back to a rhythmic contemporary format once again, while maintaining the Move branding and a small amount of rhythmic recurrents. CFXJ would also change slogans to "Toronto's Hits. Toronto's Throwbacks." before changing to "Toronto's Hip Hop".

Newcap Radio was acquired by Stingray Group in October 2018. On February 11, 2019, CFXJ reverted to the Flow 93.5 branding and returned to an urban contemporary format.

Flow moves to 98.7; Today Radio (2022–present) 
On February 9, 2022, Stingray announced that it had reached an agreement with CKFG-FM and its new owner, Neeti P. Ray's CINA Media Group, to move the Flow branding to that station beginning February 14, and that 93.5 would launch a new format the same day. CFXJ subsequently went jockless, and much of its on-air staff was let go. A Stingray executive stated that the company had originally wanted to "[bring] Flow back to its roots as a community-driven station". However, after realizing that this would have competed directly with CKFG, Stingray instead reached an agreement to transfer the Flow brand to the station. CINA plans to position the station as serving the entirety of Toronto's Black Canadian community by essentially merging the two formats into one station, adding the hip-hop already heard on Flow to its existing format of R&B and Afro-Caribbean music.

On February 13, CFXJ began stunting with a self-described "random selection" of pop songs, interspersed with promos redirecting "Flow" listeners to 98.7, and sweepers stating that "Today" was "arriving tomorrow". The following day, CFXJ relaunched as 93.5 Today Radio, an adult hits format with a focus on topical discussions and interactions with listeners. The brand and format, which are licensed from a Vancouver-based marketing company, are also used on Pattison Media's CKCE-FM in Calgary, with similarities to the Now! hot adult contemporary format used by its sister stations CKNO-FM/Edmonton and CHNW-FM/Winnipeg.

On September 20, the CRTC published applications by Stingray to add boosters for CFXJ on the 93.5 frequency in Mississauga as well as the North York district of Toronto, which Stingray said would be the first single-frequency network implementation of its kind in Canada.

Footnotes

References

External links
 
 
 

FXJ
FXJ
FXJ
Radio stations established in 2001
2001 establishments in Ontario